The Martial Billeaud Jr. House is a historic house located at 118 North Morgan Avenue in Broussard, Louisiana.

Built in 1893, the house is a large Queen Anne style frame cottage with a projecting bay with a mansard roof. It's the only example of Second Empire architecture in Lafayette Parish.

The house was listed on the National Register of Historic Places on March 14, 1983.

It is one of 10 individually NRHP-listed houses in the "Broussard Multiple Resource Area", which also includes: 
Alesia House
Billeaud House

Valsin Broussard House 
Comeaux House 
Ducrest Building
Janin Store 
Roy-LeBlanc House 
St. Cecilia School 
St. Julien House 
Main Street Historic District

See also
 National Register of Historic Places listings in Lafayette Parish, Louisiana

References

Houses on the National Register of Historic Places in Louisiana
Second Empire architecture in Louisiana
Queen Anne architecture in Louisiana
Houses completed in 1893
Lafayette Parish, Louisiana
National Register of Historic Places in Lafayette Parish, Louisiana
1893 establishments in Louisiana